Solstice Canyon is a park within the Santa Monica Mountains National Recreation Area in Malibu, California. Located off Corral Canyon Road from Pacific Coast Highway, the canyon runs north-to-south about a mile east of Point Dume. The park opened on June 20, 1988 and was created out of land owned by the Santa Monica Mountains Conservancy. Before becoming a park, the land was known as Roberts Ranch and, from 1961 to 1973, hosted a space research facility. 

In 2003, a Chumash grave site was discovered within the park.

Notable structures

Keller
Around 1865, Matthew Keller built a stone cottage in the canyon as part of his Rancho Malibu. The structure is believed to be the oldest existing stone building in Malibu. After surviving countless wildfires, the structure was finally left in ruins by the 2007 Corral Canyon Fire.

Swinney
Cordelia and Henry Swinney built a wooden cabin in the 1880s inside the Malibu land grant. Swinney was told that he was on the wrong side of the boundary line, so he disassembled the cabin and moved it a few hundred feet north, across the Rancho Boundary. That is where Keller's stone house was built to replace the old wooden cabin. The stone house is still there today, and it marks the spot where Swinney moved his cabin to (just outside the property line).

Roberts
In 1952, Florence and Fred Roberts, founder, in the late 1920s, of Roberts Public Market chain based in Santa Monica, had a canyon home built. Paul Williams designed the house, later featured in Architectural Digest, notable for its blend of natural features within the design, including waterfalls, creeks and trees. The structure was razed by a wildfire in 1982, though its remains have become a popular hiking destination since the park opened in 1988.

References

Santa Monica Mountains
Parks in Los Angeles County, California